Georges Dreyer ForMemRS (4 July 1873 – 17 August 1934) was a Danish pathologist.

Biography
Dreyer was born in Shanghai, where his father was stationed as an officer with the Royal Danish Navy. In 1900 he earned his medical degree from the University of Copenhagen, and subsequently began work in the field of bacteriology, of which he spent a period of time at Finsen Institute in Copenhagen.

In 1907 he became the first professor of pathology at Oxford University, a position he maintained until 1934, the year he died. During World War I, Dreyer was a consultant to the British Royal Flying Corps. He was elected a fellow of the Royal Society in May 1921.

Dreyer specialized in the fields of bacteriology and virology, performing extensive studies involving vaccines and immunization. He conducted investigations on variations of blood volume among different species, and studied the relationship of blood volume to an animals' surface area and weight. Dreyer is also credited with introducing a modification of the Widal test for diagnosis of typhoid and paratyphoid.

He is remembered today for his work in respiratory physiology, that included experiments with oxygen in regards to aviation. During World War I, he developed a device that was capable of administering low oxygen mixtures to test the effects of hypoxia in aviators. He also developed a successful oxygen delivery system, and was responsible for installation of the first low-pressure chamber at a British learning institution.

See also
 Pathology
 List of pathologists

References

Further reading
  Georges Dreyer (1873–1934) and a forgotten episode of respiratory physiology at Oxford

1873 births
1934 deaths
Danish expatriates in the United Kingdom
Danish pathologists
Danish microbiologists
Fellows of the Royal Society
Danish expatriates in China